Kristina Riis-Johannessen (born 5 March 1991) is a Norwegian former alpine ski racer. She competed in Super G, Giant slalom and Combined. She competed at the 2017 World Championships in St. Moritz, Switzerland, where she placed 21st in the Super-G. Riss-Johannessen attended the University of Vermont where she was a member of the ski team and was the 2014 NCAA National Champion in the women's slalom.

She made her World Cup debut in December 2016 in Semmering, but did not finish the race, and collected her first World Cup points with a 24th place in March 2017 in Squaw Valley.

World Championship results

References

External links

1991 births
Living people
Alpine skiers from Oslo
Norwegian female alpine skiers
Vermont Catamounts skiers
Norwegian expatriate sportspeople in the United States